Avonburg is an unincorporated community in Pleasant Township, Switzerland County, in the U.S. state of Indiana.

History
An old variant name of the community was called Soapville.

Geography

References

Unincorporated communities in Switzerland County, Indiana
Unincorporated communities in Indiana